Abdel-Wahab El-Messiri (1938-July 2, 2008) was an Egyptian scholar, author and general coordinator of the opposition organization Kefaya.

Life
El-Messiri was born in Damanhur, Egypt, graduated with a BA in English literature from Alexandria University in 1959. He received a MA in English and comparative literature from Columbia University in 1964 and a PhD in the same field from Rutgers University in 1969. He was professor emeritus of English and comparative literature at Ain Shams University, Egypt since 1988. He was also a University Professor at King Saud University, Saudi Arabia (1983–1988) and at Kuwait University, Kuwait (1988–1989) and a visiting professor at the International Islamic University Malaysia. He is considered as one of Egypt's most famous thinkers and very well known among Arab scholars.

El-Messiri's major areas of research included: Jews, Judaism and Zionism; secularism and prejudice; Western culture and contemporaneity; modernism and postmodernism; literary theory and comparative literature. Over the course of his life his outlook moved from western secularism to a modern Islamic vision. El-Messiri wrote several articles about his ideas, including "Chosen Community, an Exceptional Burden", "A People Like Any other". He has also written for children.

His eight-volume Encyclopedia of Jews, Judaism and Zionism (" موسوعة اليهود واليهودية والصهيونية: نموذج تفسيري جديد"), written in Arabic with an analytical/methodological form rather than an encyclopedic collection of information, is intended to provide analysis of the Middle East crisis, the history of Jews and the history of Zionism, as well as an in-depth analysis of Zionism, its ideology and beliefs, and ultimately the goals of such movement.

On July 2, 2008 he died after a very long battle against cancer at the Palestine Hospital, Cairo.

Statements by Abdel Wahab El-Messiri 
 "The functional nature of Israel means that it was created by the colonialism for a specific purpose. It is thus a colonial project that has nothing to do with Judaism".

English language publications 

 "Israel, Base of Western Imperialism" (Committee of Supporting Middle East Liberation, New York, 1969)
 A Lover from Palestine and Other Poems (Palestine Information Office, Washington D.C., 1972)
 Israel and South Africa: The Progression of a Relationship (North American, New Brunswick, N.J., 1976; second edition 1977; third edition, 1980; Arabic translation, 1980)
 The Land of Promise: A Critique of Political Zionism (North American, New Brunswick, N.J., 1977)
 Three Studies in English Literature (North American, New Brunswick, N.J., 1979)
 The Palestinian Wedding: A Bilingual Anthology of Contemporary Palestinian Resistance Poetry [editor] (Three Continents Press, Washington D.C., 1983)
 A Land of Stone and Thyme: Palestinian Short Stories [co-editor] (Quartet, London, 1996). Translated by Anthony Calderbank
 "Epistemological Bias in the Social and Physical Sciences" (International Institute of Islamic Thought, London - Washington, 2006)

References

Bibliography 
  Haggag Ali (2013) Mapping the Secular Mind: Modernity's Quest for a Godless Utopia. London: International Institute of Islamic Thought.

External links 

  Official homepage including an online version of the Jews, judaism and Zionism encyclopedia.
 "A people like any other" Al-Ahram
 Abdelwahab M. Elmessiri 1938-2008 in TheFreeLibrary.com.
 Dr. Abdul-Wahab El-Messiri: leading intellectual light of Islam and politics in Egypt Obituary in the Yemen Times, 15 July 2008
 "On life, literature and Palestine, a tribute to Abdelwahab Elmessiri" Obituary on The Electronic Intifada, 4 August 2008
 Abdel-Wahab M. El-Messiri: A global specialist in the Zionist movement’s history
 Samir Abuzaid, Professor Abdel-Wahab Elmessiri at arabphilosophers.com
 Ahl Ben Taleb, M.A, “Abdelwahab Elmessiri’s theoretical abrogation and appropriationof Western and Zionist Terminology”

1938 births
2008 deaths
Alexandria University alumni
Columbia Graduate School of Arts and Sciences alumni
Rutgers University alumni
Academic staff of Ain Shams University
Academic staff of King Saud University
Academic staff of the International Islamic University Malaysia
Egyptian writers
Egyptian philosophers
Deaths from cancer in Egypt
Academic staff of Kuwait University
People from Damanhur
Egyptian children's writers
20th-century philosophers